Yu Ruqin (born 21 November 1935) is a Chinese chemist. He served as president of Hunan University from 1993 to 1999 and is an academician of the Chinese Academy of Sciences.

Biography
Yu was born in Shanghai, but was raised in Changsha, Hunan, his hometown. He secondary studied at Yali School. He graduated from Beijing Foreign Studies University and Saint Petersburg State University. After graduation, he worked at the Institute of Chemistry of the Chinese Academy of Sciences. At the same time, he taught at the University of Science and Technology of China.

He taught at Hunan University since 1962, what he was promoted to professor in 1980, and served as the university's president from 1993 to 1999.

In 1991, he was elected a fellow of the Chinese Academy of Sciences. He is a member of the Chinese Chemical Society. He was a member of the 6th, 8th, and 9th National Committee of the Chinese People's Political Consultative Conference.

References

1935 births
Living people
Beijing Foreign Studies University alumni
Chemists from Shanghai
Educators from Hunan
Members of the Chinese Academy of Sciences
People from Changsha
Presidents of Hunan University
Saint Petersburg State University alumni
Scientists from Hunan
Academic staff of the University of Science and Technology of China